Creximil  is a small village located in San Miguel das Negradas (O Vicedo), in the Sor estuary in Spain.

Etymology
This toponym may come from  *(villa) Wistimiri, the form in genitive of Wistimirus.

References

Municipalities in the Province of Lugo